Denis Smith may refer to:

Denis Smith (English cricketer) (1907–1979), played Test cricket for England
Denis Smith (footballer, born 1947), English football player and manager
Denis Smith (footballer, born 1932) (1932–2004), English football player
Denis Smith (West Indian cricketer) (born 1991), West Indian cricketer from Grenada
Denis Mack Smith (1920–2017), English historian

See also
Denis Smyth (born 1948), professor of history at the University of Toronto
Dennis Smith (disambiguation)